Hiaq (also Romanized as Hīaq, and Hīyaq; also known as Īvā and Iya) is a village in Mavazekhan-e Shomali Rural District, Khvajeh District, Heris County, East Azerbaijan Province, Iran. At the 2006 census, its population was 238, in 53 families.

References 

Populated places in Heris County